Margarita García Robayo (born 1980) is a Colombian novelist and writer. She was born in Cartagena on the Caribbean coast. She has written several novels and short story collections as well as a book of autobiographical essays. Her book Cosas peores (Worse Things) won the Casa de las Américas Prize in 2014. Her work has been translated into English, French, Portuguese, Italian, Hebrew, and Chinese.

Since 2005, she has lived in Buenos Aires, Argentina.

Works
 Hay ciertas cosas que una no puede hacer descalza. Barcelona: Ediciones Destino, 2010.
 Lo que no aprendí. Buenos Aires: Planeta, 2013.
 Cosas peores. Bogotá: Alfaguara, 2014.
 Tiempo muerto. Bogotá: Alfaguara, 2017.
 Primera persona. Lima: Pesopluma, 2017.
 Fish Soup. Edinburgh: Charco Press, 2018. Translated by Charlotte Coombe.
 Holiday Heart. Edinburgh: Charco Press, 2020. Translated by Charlotte Coombe

References

1980 births
Living people
Colombian short story writers
Colombian novelists
Colombian autobiographers
Colombian women writers
People from Cartagena, Colombia
Writers from Buenos Aires